Siddhi Savetsila (7 January 1919 – 5 December 2015) was a Thai air force officer and politician. After finishing his military career with the rank of air chief marshal, he served as the foreign minister of Thailand from 1980 to 1990. In 1991, he became a member of the Privy Council of King Bhumibol Adulyadej. He was the president of the united nations security council in 1985 with Mom Luang Birabhongse Kasemsri.

Life and career 

Siddhi Savetsila was born in Bangkok. He is a member of the Thai aristocracy. His father was a high-ranking official in the royal government. His paternal grandfather was Henry Alabaster who was the British consul in Siam during the reign of King Rama IV (Mongkut) and then served as an advisor to King Rama V (Chulalongkorn). His mother was an offspring of the influential Bunnag family. He is a direct descendant of Somdet Chao Phraya Borom Maha Prayurawongse.

Siddhi studied metallurgic engineering at the Massachusetts Institute of Technology (MIT), graduating with an S.B. degree in 1943. During the Second World War, he joined the Free Thai Movement (Seri Thai) which resisted against the de facto occupation of Thailand by Japanese forces. He collected data for the US foreign-intelligence agency OSS (predecessor of the CIA) and was temporarily detained by the Japanese. Two of Siddhis sisters married US intelligence operatives, one was the wife of former OSS agent Willis Bird and one of CIA officer William Lair. After the end of the war, he returned to the MIT and received his S.M. degree in 1947.

He then served in the Royal Thai Air Force and rose up to the rank of air chief marshal (phon akat ek). From 1975 to 1980 he served as secretary-general of the National Security Council. In this position he assisted Prime Minister Kriangsak Chomanan at the time of the Vietnamese invasion of Cambodia 1978/79.

In 1980, Kriangsak appointed him minister of foreign affairs. He kept this position when Prem Tinsulanonda took over the premiership a few months later. As Thailand' representative in the United Nations (UN) and ASEAN, Siddhi advocated a tough line towards Vietnam which was occupying Cambodia after 1979. In 1983, Siddhi was elected member of parliament and in 1985 he took over the leadership of the Social Action Party (SAP) following the retirement of Kukrit Pramoj. The party did well in the 1986 election and Siddhi additionally became deputy prime minister for a short time.

In August 1990, the new Prime Minister Chatichai Choonhavan dismissed Siddhi as he sought a more pragmatic relationship with the communist-ruled countries of Southeast Asia. Siddhi's SAP was in great difficulties during the late 1980s and, in September 1990, Siddhi gave up his chairmanship. One month later, he completely retired from the parliament and the party, stating that he was tired of politics. In 1991 King Bhumibol appointed him to his privy council.

Siddhi holds honorary doctorate degrees from the University of the Philippines, the National University of Singapore and five universities in Thailand. He was decorated with the Order of Chula Chom Klao (first class), the Order of the White Elephant (special class) and the Order of the Crown of Thailand (special class), as well as foreign decorations from 14 countries.

On 8 May 2000, he was among the five Free Thai veterans who were awarded the Agency Seal Medallion by CIA director George Tenet.

He died on 5 December 2015 at the age of 96.

Honour

Foreign honour
  : Honorary Commander of the Order of the Defender of the Realm (P.M.N.) (1983)
 : Grand Cross of the Order of Prince Henry(G.C.I.H.)
 : Medal of Freedom

Military rank
 Air Chief Marshal

Volunteer Defense Corps of Thailand rank
 Volunteer Defense Corps Lieutenant Colonel

References 

1919 births
2015 deaths
Siddhi Savetsila
Siddhi Savetsila
Siddhi Savetsila
Siddhi Savetsila
Siddhi Savetsila
Siddhi Savetsila
Siddhi Savetsila
Siddhi Savetsila
Siddhi Savetsila
Siddhi Savetsila